Gollan is a surname. Notable people with the name include:

Alberto Gollán (1918-2014), Argentine television businessman 
Alexander Gollan (1840-1902), British diplomat
Daniel Gollán (born 1955), Argentine politician and physician
Donald Gollan (1896-1971), British athlete in Olympic rowing
George Gollan (1886-1957), Australian political figure 
Henry Gollan (1868-1949), British lawyer and judge
John Gollan (1911-1977), General Secretary of the Communist Party of Great Britain
Roy Gollan (1892–1968), Australian diplomat
Spencer Gollan (1860-1934), New Zealand-born athlete in rowing, racehorse owner
William Gollan (1885-1968), Australian political figure

See also 
Golan (disambiguation)
Gullen (disambiguation)